The Windward Passage is a strait in the Caribbean Sea, between the islands of Cuba and Hispaniola.

With Navassa Island on its southern approach, it connects the Atlantic Ocean to the Caribbean Sea, and is in the direct path of shipping between the Panama Canal and the eastern seaboard of the United States. From either the eastern tip of the Guantánamo Province of Cuba, or the western tip of Haiti's Nord-Ouest Department, it is possible to see lights on the other side of the Windward Passage.

Territorial dispute
For decades, Cuba and Haiti had disputes over where the maritime boundary between the two nations was. In 1977, they settled by signing the Cuba–Haiti Maritime Boundary Agreement setting the official boundary.

Geology
The Septentrional-Oriente fault zone passes through the Windward Passage from the southern coast of Cuba to the northern coast of Hispaniola.  During the Holocene the slip rate between these two islands was /year.  The Septentrional Fault extends east at least to the still active Mona Rift in the Mona Passage, where extension occurs between Hispaniola and Puerto Rico.  The last rupture of this fault occurred in 1842; the resulting earthquake and tsunami devastated Cap Haitien.  Considerable seismic hazard continues to exist on this fault:

The Windward Passage region was studied in detail by a voyage of the E/V Nautilus in August 2014, assisted by the ROV Hercules.  This expedition provided measurements of water circulation through the straight, as well as observations of animal life on the deep continental shelf.

See also

References

Straits of the Caribbean
Geography of Cuba
Geography of Hispaniola
Bodies of water of Cuba
Bodies of water of Haiti
Cuba–Haiti border
International straits